Said Daniel Llambay (born 5 October 1994) is an Argentine professional footballer who plays as a midfielder for SK Bischofshofen in Austria.

Career
Llambay had a period in the youth of Spanish club Málaga, before joining Olimpo's ranks in 2012. Three years later, in 2015, he was loaned out to Torneo Federal B's Sol de Mayo. On 28 August 2016, Llambay made his professional career debut with Olimpo during a 1–0 Argentine Primera División defeat to Unión Santa Fe. He made a total of four appearances in 2016–17. His first senior goal arrived on 3 March 2019 against Santamarina, as he played twenty-three times for Olimpo in league and cup.

In January 2020, Llambay joined Austrian Regionalliga side SK Bischofshofen on loan. He featured in three friendlies in February, scoring once versus SV Lugstein Cabs Friedburg / Pöndorf, though wouldn't appear in the league due to the COVID-19 pandemic causing it to be cancelled. He would make his Regionalliga debut when the league started for 2020–21 in August, appearing for the full duration of a 1–0 loss to St. Johann.

Career statistics
.

References

External links

1994 births
Living people
Sportspeople from Buenos Aires Province
Argentine footballers
Association football midfielders
Argentine expatriate footballers
Expatriate footballers in Austria
Argentine expatriate sportspeople in Austria
Argentine Primera División players
Primera Nacional players
Torneo Federal A players
Austrian Regionalliga players
Olimpo footballers